Access (sometimes called Take 30 Access and CBC Access)
was a Canadian Community television series which
aired on CBC Television from 1974 to 1982, except 1981.

Premise
The series offered airtime to Canadian organisations to inform Canadians of their
concerns and opinions. Groups applied to the CBC for the opportunity to produce
an episode of Access. Successful applicants were given assistance by CBC
staff to develop their programme in a four-week production time frame. Contents
of the programmes were subject to CBC policies regarding political promotion,
fundraising and defamatory content, in addition to CRTC regulations.

Scheduling and production
Access aired during the middle of each year, prior to the start of the fall programming season.

References

External links
 

CBC Television original programming
1974 Canadian television series debuts
1982 Canadian television series endings
1970s Canadian television news shows
1980s Canadian television news shows